Rapeseed oil is one of the oldest known vegetable oils. There are both edible and industrial forms produced from rapeseed, the seed of several cultivars of the plant family Brassicaceae. Historically, it was eaten in limited quantities due to high levels of erucic acid, which is damaging to the cardiac muscle of animals and imparts a bitter taste, and glucosinolates, which made it less nutritious in animal feed. Rapeseed oil can contain up to 54% erucic acid.

Canola oil is a food-grade version derived from rapeseed cultivars bred for low erucic acid content. Also known as low erucic acid rapeseed (LEAR) oil, it has been generally recognized as safe by the United States Food and Drug Administration. Canola oil is limited by government regulation to a maximum of 2% erucic acid by weight in the US and the EU, with special regulations for infant food. These low levels of erucic acid do not cause harm in humans.

In commerce, non-food varieties are typically called colza oil.

Rapeseed is extensively cultivated in Canada, France, Belgium, Ireland, the United Kingdom, the United States, the Netherlands, Germany, Denmark, and Poland. In France and Denmark, especially, the extraction of the oil is an important industry.

History 
The name for rapeseed comes from the Latin word  meaning turnip. Turnip, rutabaga (swede), cabbage, Brussels sprouts, and mustard are related to rapeseed. Rapeseed belongs to the genus Brassica. Brassica oilseed varieties are some of the oldest plants cultivated by humanity, with documentation of its use in India 4,000 years ago, and use in China and Japan 2,000 years ago. Its use in Northern Europe for oil lamps is documented to the 13th century. Rapeseed oil extracts were first put on the market in 1956–1957 as food products, but these suffered from several unacceptable characteristics. Rapeseed oil had a distinctive taste and a greenish colour, due to the presence of chlorophyll. It also contained a high concentration of erucic acid.

Canola was bred from rapeseed cultivars of B. napus and B. rapa at the University of Manitoba, Canada, by Keith Downey and Baldur R. Stefansson in the early 1970s, having then a different nutritional profile than present-day oil in addition to much less erucic acid. Canola was originally a trademark name of the Rapeseed Association of Canada, and the name was a condensation of "Can" from Canada and "OLA " meaning "Oil, low acid", but is now a generic term for edible varieties of rapeseed oil in North America and Australasia. The change in name serves to distinguish it from natural rapeseed oil, which has much higher erucic acid content.

A genetically engineered rapeseed that is tolerant to the herbicide Roundup (glyphosate) was first introduced to Canada in 1995 (Roundup Ready). A genetically modified variety developed in 1998 is considered to be the most disease- and drought-resistant canola variety to date. In 2009, 90% of the Canadian crop was herbicide-tolerant. In 2005, 87% of the canola grown in the US was genetically modified. In 2011, out of the 31 million hectares of canola grown worldwide, 8.2 million (26%) were genetically modified.

A 2010 study conducted in North Dakota found glyphosate- or glufosinate-resistance transgenes in 80% of wild natural rapeseed plants, and a few plants that were resistant to both herbicides. This may reduce the effectiveness of the herbicide tolerance trait for weed control over time, as the weed species could also become tolerant to the herbicide. However, one of the researchers agrees that "feral populations could have become established after trucks carrying cultivated GM seeds spilled some of their load during transportation". She also notes that the GM canola results they found may have been biased as they only sampled along roadsides.

Genetically modified canola attracts a price penalty compared to non-GM canola; in Western Australia, it is estimated to be 7.2% on average.

Production and trade 

In 2019, world production of rapeseed oil was 24 million tonnes, led by Canada, China, and India as the largest producers, accounting together for 40% of the world total. Canada was the world's largest exporter of rapeseed oil in 2019, shipping 3.2 million tonnes or approximately 76% of its total production.

The benchmark price for worldwide canola trade is the ICE Futures Canada (formerly Winnipeg Commodity Exchange) canola futures contract.

In China, rapeseed meal is mostly used as a soil fertilizer rather than for animal feed, while canola is used mainly for frying food. In the words of one observer, "China has a vegetable oil supply shortage of 20 million tonnes per year. It covers a large percentage of that shortage with soybean imports from Brazil, the U.S. and Argentina."

GMO regulation 

There are several forms of genetic modification, such as herbicide (glyphosate and glufosinate, for example) tolerance and different qualities in canola oil. Regulation varies from country to country; for example, glyphosate-resistant canola has been approved in Australia, Canada, China, Japan, Korea, Mexico, Philippines, and the US, while Laurical, a product with a different oil composition, has been approved for growing only in Canada and the US.

In 2003, Australia's gene technology regulator approved the release of canola genetically modified to make it resistant to glufosinate ammonium, a herbicide. The introduction of the genetically modified crop to Australia generated considerable controversy. Canola is Australia's third biggest crop, and is used often by wheat farmers as a break crop to improve soil quality. As of 2008, the only genetically modified crops in Australia were canola, cotton, and carnations.

GMO litigation 
Genetically modified canola has become a point of controversy and contentious legal battles. In one high-profile case (Monsanto Canada Inc v. Schmeiser) the Monsanto Company sued Percy Schmeiser for patent infringement after he replanted canola seed he had harvested from his field, which he discovered was contaminated with Monsanto's patented glyphosate-tolerant canola by spraying it with glyphosate, leaving only the resistant plants. The Canadian Supreme Court ruled that Percy was in violation of Monsanto's patent because he knowingly isolated and replanted the resistant seed that he had harvested. On 19 March 2008, Schmeiser and Monsanto Canada Inc. came to an out-of-court settlement whereby Monsanto would pay for the clean-up costs of the contamination, which came to a total of C$660. In Western Australia, in the Marsh v Baxter case, a GM canola farmer was sued by his organic neighbour because GM canola contamination led to the loss of organic certification. Although the facts of the case and the losses to the organic farmer were agreed between the parties, the judge did not find the GM farmer liable for the losses.

Production process 

Canola oil is made at a processing facility by slightly heating and then crushing the seed. Almost all commercial canola oil is then extracted using hexane solvent, which is recovered at the end of processing. Finally, the canola oil is refined using water precipitation and organic acid to remove gums and free fatty acids, filtering to remove color, and deodorizing using steam distillation.

Cold-pressed and expeller-pressed canola oil are also produced on a more limited basis. About 44% of a seed is oil, with the remainder as a canola meal used for animal feed. About  of canola seed makes  of canola oil. Canola oil is a key ingredient in many foods. Its reputation as a healthful oil has created high demand in markets around the world, and overall it is the third-most widely consumed vegetable oil, after soybean oil and palm oil.

The oil has many non-food uses and, like soybean oil, is often used interchangeably with non-renewable petroleum-based oils in products, including industrial lubricants, biodiesel, candles, lipsticks, and newspaper inks.

Canola vegetable oils certified as organic are required to be from non-GMO rapeseed.

Nutrition and health 

Canola oil is considered safe for human consumption, and has a relatively low amount of saturated fat, a substantial amount of monounsaturated fat, with roughly a 2:1 mono- to polyunsaturated fats ratio.

In 2006, canola oil was given a qualified health claim by the United States Food and Drug Administration for lowering the risk of coronary heart disease, resulting from its significant content of unsaturated fats; the allowed claim for food labels states:"Limited and not conclusive scientific evidence suggests that eating about 1  tablespoons (19 grams) of canola oil daily may reduce the risk of coronary heart disease due to the unsaturated fat content in canola oil. To achieve this possible benefit, canola oil is to replace a similar amount of saturated fat and not increase the total number of calories you eat in a day. One serving of this product contains [x] grams of canola oil."A 2013 review, sponsored by the Canola Council of Canada and the U.S. Canola Association, concluded there was a substantial reduction in total cholesterol and low-density lipoprotein (LDL) cholesterol, and an increase in tocopherol levels and improved insulin sensitivity, compared with other sources of dietary fat. A 2014 review of health effects from consuming plant oils rich in alpha-linolenic acid, including canola, stated that there was moderate benefit for lower risk of cardiovascular diseases, bone fractures, and type-2 diabetes.

A 2019 review of randomized clinical trials found that canola oil consumption reduces total cholesterol (TC) and LDL compared to sunflower oil and saturated fat. Consumption of canola oil has been shown to reduce body weight when compared with saturated fat.

Regarding individual components, canola oil is low in saturated fat and contains both omega-6 and omega-3 fatty acids in a ratio of 2:1. It is high in monounsaturated fats, which may decrease the risk of heart disease.

Erucic acid 

Although wild rapeseed oil contains significant amounts of erucic acid, the cultivars used to produce commercial, food-grade canola oil were bred to contain less than 2% erucic acid, an amount deemed not significant as a health risk. To date, no health effects have been associated with dietary consumption of erucic acid by humans; but tests of erucic acid metabolism in other species imply that higher levels may be detrimental. Canola oil produced using genetically modified plants has also not been shown to explicitly produce adverse effects.

The erucic acid content in canola oil has been reduced over the years. In western Canada, a reduction occurred from the average content of 0.5% between 1987 and 1996 to a current content of 0.01% from 2008 to 2015. Other reports also show a content lower than 0.1% in Australia and Brazil.

It is usually accepted that it poses no unusual health risks, and its consumption in food-grade forms is generally recognized as safe by the United States Food and Drug Administration.

Comparison to other vegetable oils

Uses 
Apart from its use for human consumption, rapeseed oil is extensively used as a lubricant for machinery. It was widely used in European domestic lighting before the advent of coal (city) gas or kerosene. It was the preferred oil for train pot lamps, and was used for lighting railway coaches in the United Kingdom before gas lighting, and later electric lighting, were adopted. Burned in a Carcel lamp, it was part of the definition of the French standard measure for illumination, the carcel, for most of the nineteenth century. In lighthouses, for example in early Canada, rapeseed oil was used before the introduction of mineral oil. Rapeseed oil was used with the Argand burner because it was cheaper than whale oil.  Rapeseed oil was burned to a limited extent in the Confederacy during the American Civil War.

Rapeseed oil was used in Gombault's Caustic Balsam, a popular horse and human liniment at the turn of the 20th century.

Among the more unusual applications of rapeseed oil is the calming of choppy seas, where the oil modifies the surface tension of the water and rapidly smooths the surface. For this purpose, rapeseed oil was carried in ship's lifeboats.

Biodiesel

Rapeseed oil is used as diesel fuel, either as biodiesel, straight in heated fuel systems, or blended with petroleum distillates for powering motor vehicles. Biodiesel may be used in pure form in newer engines without engine damage and is frequently combined with fossil-fuel diesel in ratios varying from 2% to 20% biodiesel. Owing to the costs of growing, crushing, and refining rapeseed biodiesel, rapeseed-derived biodiesel from new oil costs more to produce than standard diesel fuel, so diesel fuels are commonly made from the used oil. Rapeseed oil is the preferred oil stock for biodiesel production in most of Europe, accounting for about 80% of the feedstock, partly because rapeseed produces more oil per unit of land area compared to other oil sources, such as soybeans, but primarily because canola oil has a significantly lower gel point than most other vegetable oils.

Because of reduction in suitable land caused by climate change, a 2018 study predicted that rapeseed would become an unreliable source of oil for biofuels.

Other edible rapeseed oils 
Some less-processed versions of rapeseed oil are used for flavor in some countries. Chinese rapeseed oil was originally extracted from the field mustard. In the 19th century, rapeseed (B. rapa) was introduced by European traders, and local farmers crossed the new plant with field mustard to produce semi-winter rapeseed. The accidentally similar genetic makeup in this cultivar to canola means the Chinese rape also contains lower levels of erucic acid. The flavor of the oil comes from a different production process: the seeds are toasted before being expeller-pressed, imparting a special flavor.  In India, mustard oil is used in cooking. In the United Kingdom and Ireland, some chefs use a "cabbagey" rapeseed oil processed by cold-pressing. This cold process means that the oil has a low smoke point, and is therefore unsuitable for frying in Sichuan cuisine, for example.

Spanish rapeseed poisoning outbreak 

In 1981, there was an oil poisoning outbreak, later known as toxic oil syndrome that was attributed to people consuming what they thought was olive oil but turned out to be rapeseed cooking oil that had been denatured with 2% aniline (phenylamine). The substance was intended for industrial use but had been adulterated and illegally sold as olive oil, mainly in street markets, mostly in the Madrid area.

See also 

 List of canola diseases
 Triangle of U

References 

 

Lubricants
Brassica
Cooking oils
Vegetable oils